Gålå is a village in Sør-Fron Municipality in Innlandet county, Norway. Gålå is located on the eastern shore of the lake Gålåvatnet.

There are two main roads that connect Gålå to the rest of Sør-Fron. The main road is a fully maintained road that heads north to Harpefoss. The other road is the Peer Gynt Road (Peer Gyntveien). That mountain road is only open in the summer months. The village also has a small airport, Wadahl flyplass.

Gålå is the site of the hotels Wadahl Høgfjellshotel and Gålå Høgfjellshotell. It is also the location of Gålå Fjellgrend, a ski resort catering for both winter and summer leisure activities.

Gålå is the location of a ten-day summer cultural festival known as the Peer Gynt Festival (Peer Gynt Stemnet) set against the background of Lake Gålå (Gålåvatnet). The festival includes performances of Peer Gynt, a five-act play by the Norwegian dramatist Henrik Ibsen.

Etymology
The village is named after the old Gålå mountain farm. The mountain farm is named after the nearby lake Gålåvatnet. The lake is named after the river Golo. The Old Norse form of the river name was probably Gola and is then derived from the verb gola meaning "howl", "yell", or "scream". The river has a steep fall, and makes a lot of noise.

References

External links 
Gålå Hotel website
Wadahl Høgfjellshotel  website
Gålå Fjellgrend website
Peer Gynt stemnet website

Sør-Fron
Villages in Innlandet
Ski areas and resorts in Norway